Earl(e) Bradford Avery (February 4, 1894 – November 6, 1977) was a driver and trainer of standardbred racehorses who was inducted into both the Canadian and United States Harness Racing Halls of Fame.

Racing career
He earned his first win on August 19, 1919, at Island Park race track in Woodstock, New Brunswick. Although he would become very successful racing in his native New Brunswick and at New England tracks, Avery would continue to personally operate his 600-acre potato farm for the next 29 years. In 1948 he relocated to the United States to pursue a career in racing on a full-time basis. In 1951 he was the leading driver at Laurel Raceway in Maryland. Having worked off and on for a number of years for Norman Woolworth's Clearview Farm, in 1955 he accepted Woolworth's offer to take over as full-time head trainer and driver. While Avery had success with many horses during his seventeen years with Woolworth's stable, the best was the great runner and outstanding sire, Meadow Skipper.

Retirement
Following Earle Avery's announcement that he would be retiring from racing in October 1972, he was honored by the racing community and its fans with an Earle Avery Night at Yonkers Raceway. He retired to his hometown in New Brunswick where he died at age 83 in 1977.

References

1894 births
1977 deaths
Canadian harness racing drivers
Canadian harness racing trainers
American harness racers
Canadian Horse Racing Hall of Fame inductees
United States Harness Racing Hall of Fame inductees
New Brunswick Sports Hall of Fame inductees
Sportspeople from New Brunswick